Enaptin also known as nesprin-1 or synaptic nuclear envelope protein 1 (syne-1) is an actin-binding protein that in humans that is encoded by the SYNE1 gene.

Function 

This gene encodes a spectrin repeat containing protein expressed in skeletal and smooth muscle, and peripheral blood lymphocytes, that localizes to the nuclear membrane.

Enaptin is a nuclear envelope protein found in human myocytes and synapses, which is made up of 8,797 amino acids. Enaptin is involved in the maintenance of nuclear organization and structural integrity, tethering the cell nucleus to the cytoskeleton by interacting with the nuclear envelope and with F-actin in the cytoplasm.

Structure 

Enaptin contains a coiled alpha-helical region and a large beta-sheet region in the upper part and at least four alpha-helices spliced together, indicating the similarity with collagen. The protein is made up of three main parts, as can be seen in the diagram:  cytoplasmic (1-8746), anchor for type IV membrane protein (8747-8767), and the sequence for perinuclear space (8768-8797).  The region in the perinuclear space contains a KASH domain.

The molecular weight of the mature protein is approximately 1,011 kDa, and it has a theoretical pI of 5.38.  The protein's chemical formula is C44189H71252N12428O14007S321.  It has a theoretical Instability Index (II) of 51.63, indicating that it would be unstable in a test tube.  The protein's in vivo half-life, the time it takes for half of the amount of protein in a cell to disappear after its synthesis in the cell, is predicted to be approximately 30 hours (in mammalian reticulocytes).

Clinical significance 

Mutations in this gene have been associated with autosomal recessive spinocerebellar ataxia 8, also referred to as autosomal recessive cerebellar ataxia type 1 or recessive ataxia of Beauce.

References

Further reading

External links
 GeneReview/NCBI/NIH/UW entry on SYNE1-Related Autosomal Recessive Cerebellar Ataxia
 

Proteins